Red Rocker may refer to:

Sammy Hagar, a singer nicknamed "Red Rocker"
Red Rockers, a 1980s band
Red Rocker, one of the two duelling robot boxers from the toy and game Rock 'Em Sock 'Em Robots